Helen Whitney is an American producer, director and writer of documentaries and feature films that have aired on PBS, HBO, ABC and NBC. 

Whitney's subjects have included youth gangs, the 1996 American presidential candidates, a Trappist monastery in Massachusetts, the McCarthy Era in the United States, Pope John Paul II, and the late photographer Richard Avedon. 

Faith and Doubt at Ground Zero, was a PBS two-hour television special on the 9/11 attacks, which explored the spiritual aftershocks of this event. Whitney's film, The Mormons, was a four-hour PBS series and the first collaboration between the PBS programs American Experience and Frontline.

Whitney's film, Forgiveness: A Time to Love & A Time to Hate, examines the power, limitations – and in rare cases – the dangers of forgiveness through stories ranging from personal betrayal to international truth and reconciliation commissions. This three-hour series aired on PBS in April 2011. 

Whitney's 1982 ABC News Close-Up documentary about the McCarthy Era, American Inquisition, provoked a libel suit brought by journalist Victor Lasky. Whitney and ABC News were defended by First Amendment lawyer Floyd Abrams. The court ruled in favor of Whitney and ABC News. Abrams remarked, "we won and the broadcast was totally vindicated." 

In her feature film work, Whitney has directed actors such as Lindsay Crouse, Austin Pendleton, Blair Brown, Brenda Fricker, and David Strathairn.

Her films have received an Oscar nomination, the Alfred I. duPont–Columbia University Award, an Emmy Award and the George Foster Peabody Award.

Education

Whitney grew up in New York City, where she attended the Chapin School.  She received a BA in English literature from Sarah Lawrence College in 1965 and a master's degree in Victorian literature from the University of Chicago in 1967.

Documentary Films - Producer, Director, Writer

Dramatic Feature Films - Director
Beginning in 1982, following her acceptance by the Sundance Institute, Whitney wrote and directed several dramatic features for television.

Scripts - Writer & Co-Writer

Book
In 2011, following the release of her two-part PBS documentary "Forgiveness: A Time To Love & A Time To Hate", Whitney wrote a companion book to the film with the same title and a foreword by the Dalai Lama.

Abbreviated List of Awards and Nominations

Film and Lecture Presentations

Whitney has delivered keynote addresses and lectures at Yale University, the University of California Berkeley, Pomona College, the Harvard Divinity School, the Iliff School of Theology in Denver, Bellarmine University, the John Jay College of Criminal Justice, Syracuse University, the Louisville Presbyterian Theological Seminary and Roanoke College. In 2012, she presented the William Belden Noble Lectures at Harvard University.

She has also spoken at the Corcoran Gallery of Art, the Minneapolis Institute of Art, the Scottsdale Museum of Contemporary Art, the Cathedral of the Assumption in Louisville, KY, and the National Cathedral in Washington, D.C,

Endowed Lectures
 William Belden Noble Lectures at Memorial Church, Harvard University, 2012
 Flagler College Convocation Address for the class of 2012, St. Augustine, Florida
 The Luce Lecture at Boston University, 2007
 The Smith-Pettit Lecture on Mormonism, Salt Lake City, Utah, 2007

Artist In Residence
 Dixie State University
 Brigham Young University
 University of Utah
 Utah Valley University
 Utah State University
 The Studios of Key West
 Stanford University

Teaching
As a 2009 Woodrow Wilson scholar, Whitney has taught at Flagler College, Roanoke College and St. Mary's College.

Associations
 Film Forum, board member and chairman of the board, 1986–1991
 New York Women in Film and Television, board member
 City Church of New York, founding member

References

External links
 Helen Whitney on BlogTalk Radio about her book Forgiveness
 helenwhitney.com
 

American documentary filmmakers
Place of birth missing (living people)
Year of birth missing (living people)
Living people
Chapin School (Manhattan) alumni
Sarah Lawrence College alumni
University of Chicago alumni